The 2021 Cherwell District Council election was held on 6 May 2021 to elect members of Cherwell District Council in England. This was on the same day as other local elections. The elections were postponed from May 2020 due to the COVID-19 pandemic

Results summary

Ward Results

Adderbury, Bloxham & Bodicote

Banbury Calthorpe & Easington

Banbury Cross & Neithrop

Banbury Grimsbury & Hightown

Banbury Hardwick

Banbury Ruscote

Bicester East

Bicester North & Caversfield

Bicester South & Ambrosden

Bicester West

Cropredy, Sibfords & Wroxton

Deddington

Fringford & Heyfords

Kidlington East

Kidlington West

Launton & Otmoor

References

Cherwell District Council elections
Cherwell